The 1994 Suisse Open Gstaad, also known by its sponsored name RADO Swiss Open, was an ATP men's tennis tournament held on outdoor clay courts in Gstaad, Switzerland that was part of the World Series of the 1994 ATP Tour. It was the 49th edition of the tournament and was held from 4 July until 11 July 1994. Sergi Bruguera won his second title of the year, and 13th of his career. It was his third time winning the event after in 1992 and 1993.

Finals

Singles

 Sergi Bruguera defeated  Guy Forget 3–6, 7–5, 6–2, 6–1
 It was Bruguera's 2nd singles title of the year and the 13th of his career.

Doubles

 Sergio Casal /  Emilio Sánchez defeated  Menno Oosting /  Daniel Vacek 7–6, 6–4

References

External links
 Official website
 ITF tournament edition details

Swiss Open (tennis)
Suisse Open Gstaad
Swiss Open Gstaad